The following highways are numbered 707:

Costa Rica
 National Route 707

United States